The Islamic Republic of Iran Air Force (IRIAF);) is the aviation branch of the Islamic Republic of Iran Army. The present air force came into being when the Imperial Iranian Air Force was renamed in 1979 following the Iranian Revolution. The IRIAF was heavily involved in the Iran–Iraq War, carrying out major operations like Operation Kaman 99, Operation Sultan 10, the H-3 airstrike, and the first attack on a nuclear reactor in history, Operation Scorch Sword. As a result of eight years of aerial combat in that conflict, the IRIAF has the second highest claimed number of fighter aces in the region, exceeded only by the Israeli Air Force; as many as seven IRIAF pilots claimed more than six kills, mostly achieved in the F-14 Tomcat. Veterans of the Iran–Iraq War would go on to form the core of the IRIAF command.

History

The IRIAF came into being when the former Imperial Iranian Air Force (IIAF) was renamed following the Islamic Revolution in Iran, in February 1979. The British publishing company Orbis' Warplane partwork magazine seems to indicate the renaming did not actually take place until after the Iran–Iraq War had broken out.

This "new" Iranian air force largely inherited the equipment and structure of the former IIAF, even losing most of its leading officers in the course of post-revolutionary chaos, as well as due to the prosecution of those considered as loyal to the Shah, pro-U.S. or elsewhere by the new government in Tehran.

Due to strained relations with the west, Iran had to procure new equipment from Brazil, the Soviet Union and the People's Republic of China. Since the Revolution, the exact composition of the IRIAF has been hard to determine, but estimates do exist. Many aircraft belonging to the Iraqi Air Force took refuge in Iran during the Persian Gulf War in 1991, and many were put into service with the IRIAF or taken apart for spare parts.

Due to the continuous spare parts shortages faced by the air force, a decision was made in the late 1980s to develop a local aerospace industry to support the air force.

In 2002, Iran, with the co-operation of Ukraine, successfully started the manufacture of the Iran-140, a licence-built version of the Antonov An-140 transport aircraft. Simultaneously, Iran began construction of two domestically produced fighters, upgraded using technology from the F-14 Tomcat and the F-5 Tiger II. The fighters have been named the Azarakhsh and the Shafaq.

Since then the country has also become self-sufficient in the manufacture of helicopters. The country claims that it is capable of producing the U.S. AH-1 Cobra gunship. Additionally, Iran also produces Bell Helicopter Bell 212 and Bell 206 helicopters in serial production. These are known respectively as the Shabaviz 2-75 and the Shabaviz 206.

Iran–Iraq War (1980–88)

A series of purges and forced retirements resulted in the manpower of the service being halved between February 1979 and July 1980, leaving the IRIAF ill-prepared for the Iran–Iraq War (also called the "1st Persian Gulf War"). The sudden Iraqi air strikes against eight major Iranian airbases and four other military installations, launched on the afternoon of 22 September 1980, came as a complete surprise and caused a shock in the IRIAF.

The Iranians retaliated with operation Kaman-99 which involved 206 F-4, F-5 and F-14 aircraft.

On 23 September 1980, Iran launched Operation Kaman 99 as 40 F-4 Phantoms, armed with Mark 82, Mark 83 and Mark 84 bombs and AGM-65 Maverick missiles, took off from Hamadan. After refueling in mid-air the Phantoms reached the Iraqi capital Baghdad, where they attacked: al-Rashid, al-Habbaniyah and al-Kut airbases.

Meanwhile, eight More F-4s took off from Tehran and launched a second attack on the al-Rashid airbase.

Iran proceeded to launch 58 F-5E Tiger IIs from Tabriz, which were sent to attack Mosul Airbase. After the attack on Mosul Airbase, another 50 F-5Es were dispatched to strike Nasiriyah Airbase, which was heavily damaged.

As all 148 Iranian F-4s and F-5s had been sent for a bombing raid on Iraq, 60 F-14 Tomcats were scrambled to defend Iranian airspace against a possible Iraqi retaliation. Iranian F-14s managed to down 2 Iraqi MiG-21s (1 MiG-21RF and 1 MiG-21MF) and 3 Iraqi MiG-23s (MiG-23MS), an Iranian F-5E also shot down an Iraqi Su-20 during the operation. Iraqi MiG-23s managed to down 2 F-5Es, while Iraqi MiG-21s also downed 2 F-5Es. Iraqis also shot down one of their own Il-76MD strategic airlifters with a SA-3 SAM.

The Iraqis however were well prepared for the attack and had flown over most of their air force to other Arab countries, such as Saudi Arabia, this made sure that most of the Iraqi Air Force survived the operation.

Saddam Hussein and the Iraqi military were dealt a heavy blow when Iranian Air Force vulnerabilities failed to materialize. All Iraqi air bases' near Iran were out of order for weeks and, according to Iran, Iraq's aerial efficiency was reduced by 55%. This allowed Iranians to regroup and prepare for the upcoming Iraqi invasion.

Although the readiness rates of the IRIAF significantly increased in the following months, its overall role and influence declined, as the clerical government prioritized resources for the Islamic Revolutionary Guard Corps (IRGC) militias and simultaneously attempted to develop a separate air arm for this service.

Despite limitations and sanctions, the IRIAF achieved a successful kill rate in air-to-air combat against Iraqi jets, to the point that in air-to-air engagements, Iran's kill ratio was roughly 5:1, which is only surpassed by the Israelis against Syria in 1982 and the US in the Gulf war in 1991. It got to the point where Iraq ordered its pilots to avoid air-to-air engagements (especially with the F-14). After the successful liberation of most Iranian areas captured by the Iraqis in the first half of 1982, the situation of the IRIAF changed completely. From an air arm that was offensive by nature, it was largely relegated to air defense and relatively infrequent bombing attacks against targets of industrial and military significance inside Iraq. Simultaneously, the IRIAF had to learn how to maintain and keep operational its large fleet of U.S.-built aircraft and helicopters without outside help, due to American sanctions. Relying primarily on antiquated equipment purchased from the US in the 1970s, the Iranians began establishing their own aerospace industry.

Starting from 1984 and 1985, the IRIAF found itself confronted by an ever-better organized and equipped opponent, as the Iraqi Air force—reinforced by deliveries of advanced fighter-bombers from France and the Soviet Union—launched numerous offensives against Iranian air bases, military bases, industrial infrastructures, power plants, oil-export hubs, and population centers. These became better known as "The Tanker War" and "The War of the Cities". To defend against an increasing number of Iraqi air strikes, the IRIAF leaned heavily on its large fleet of Grumman F-14 Tomcat interceptor fighters. Tomcats were mainly deployed in defense of the strategically important Khark Island (main hub for Iranian oil exports), and Tehran. Over 300 air-to-air engagements against IQAF fighters, fighter-bombers, and bombers, were fought in these areas alone between 1980 and 1988.

Confronted with the fact that it could not obtain replacements for equipment lost in what became a war of attrition against Iraq, the IRIAF remained defense-orientated for the rest of the conflict, conserving its surviving assets as a "force in being". From mid 1987, the IRIAF found itself confronted also with U.S. Navy fighters over the Persian Gulf. A number of confrontations that occurred between July 1987 and August 1988 stretched available IRIAF assets to the limit, exhausting its capability to defend Iranian air space against Iraqi air strikes.

With this brutal air fight during 8 consecutive years, many Iranian fighter pilots, claimed world records during the war, such as General Yadollah Khalili, who holds the worldwide record of the longest straight flight in a fighter plane, having flown an F-14 non-stop for 11 hours, thus having had to do aerial refuelling 8 times during the process, or like Fereydoun Ali Mazandarani, who holds the record for being the first pilot to do aerial refuelling in an F-14 in a night environment. As a result of this war, the IRIAF developed proven tactics and skillful battle tested pilots, thus becoming one of the most experienced air arms in the region.
The most notable Iranian fighter pilots were Fereydoun Ali Mazandarani, Fazlollah Javidnia, Jalil Zandi and Shahram Rostami. Other notable pilots include, Hossein Khalatbari, Abbas Doran, Hassan Harandi, Abolfazl Mehreganfar, Ghafour Jeddi, Abbas Babaei and Ali Eghbali Dogahe among many others.

Post Iran–Iraq War

Immediately after the end of the Iran–Iraq War, the IRIAF was partially rebuilt through limited purchases of MiG-29 fighters and Su-24 bombers from the Soviet Union, as well as F-7M and FT-7 fighters from China. While providing needed reinforcement to the Iranian Air Force, these types never replaced the older, U.S.-built F-4 Phantoms, F-14s (the IRIAF is now the only air arm in the world using the fighter), or F-5s. Instead, the IRIAF continued its efforts to keep these types in service, and began a number of projects to refurbish and upgrade them.

1990s
During the 1991 Persian Gulf War, numerous Iraqi pilots flew Iraqi Air Force aircraft to Iran to avoid destruction by coalition forces. The Iranians impounded these aircraft and never returned them, putting them in service in the IRIAF and claiming them as reparations for the Iran–Iraq War. The aircraft included several Mirage F1s, MiG-23s, MiG-29s, Su-20s, Su-22Ms, Su-24s, Su-25s and a number of Il-76s, including the secret, one-off AEW-AWACS Il-76 "ADNAN 1" prototype.

Even after the cease-fire with Iraq, the IRIAF carried out several air raids against Kurdish bases in northern Iraq. The first of such raids was conducted using eight F-4s armed with rockets and cluster bombs on 6 April 1992 against People's Mujahedin of Iran's Camp Ashraf. During this event one F-4 was shot down by either insurgent or Iraqi military AAA and both pilots (Lt. Col Amini and Cpt. Sharifi) were captured and not freed until 1998. Despite threats of response, Iraq was not able to retaliate due to its own fight against Kurdish separatist guerrillas and the Western-imposed no-fly zones that crippled and limited its air force's operations.

In 2007, Iraq asked Iran to return some of the scores of Iraqi fighter plans that flew there ahead of the Gulf War in 1991. And as of 2014, Iran was receptive to the demands and was working on refurbishing an unspecified number of jets. In late 2014, Iran returned 130 military aircraft to Iraq.

2000s
In 2006, after Iranian media published a series of reports suggesting that Venezuela was interested in selling its 21 F-16 Fighting Falcons to Iran, a Hugo Chavez adviser confirmed to the Associated Press that "Venezuela's military is considering selling its fleet of U.S.-made F-16 fighter jets to another country, possibly Iran, in response to a U.S. ban on arms sales to President Hugo Chávez's government". In response, Sean McCormack, a U.S. State Department spokesperson, warned Venezuela that "without the written consent of the United States, Venezuela can't transfer these defense articles, and in this case F-16s, to a third country".

According to Moscow Defense Brief, Russia delivered 6 Su-25UBK ground attack fighter-trainers, 12 Mi-171Sh military transport helicopters, 21 Mi-171 transport helicopters, and 3 Mi-17B-5 medical helicopters to Iran between 2000 and 2006. A $700 million repair and modernization program of the IRIAF MiG-29 and Su-24 fighters was also completed.

On 22 September 2009, an IRIAF Il-76 collided with an F-5E shortly after an annual parade in Tehran and crashed near Varamin, killing all seven people on board.

2010s
At the end of 2014, there was evidence that the IRIAF was involved in the 2014 military intervention against the Islamic State of Iraq and the Levant. A video released by Aljazeera seemed to show an Iranian F-4 Phantom II bombing some ISIS buildings in Diyala Governorate.

2020s
The IRIAF air fleet is aging, some aircraft are more than 40 years old, and this has led to several crashes. On May 24, 2022 two Chinese-built Chengdu J-7 crashed east of Isfahan killing the pilots. A F-5F crashed into a school in Tabriz on February 21, 2022, killing both crew and a person on the ground. On June 1, 2021, another F-5F crashed near Dezful, killing both crew. Additionally, on 25 December 2019, an MiG-29 crashed in the Sabalan mountains, and on Aug. 26, 2018, an F-5F crash-landed near Dezful, killing the pilot and injuring the co-pilot.

Structure 
Note: former outdated Jane's Sentinel estimate of units 1993 data (Source: Jane's Sentinel, Islamic Republic of Iran, 1993, – not complete) has now been replaced by newer 2019 data

The IRIAF's composition has changed very little since 1979. There have been limited relocations and unit disbandments in the late 1980s (F-4D/E and F-14 fleet at Shiraz and Mehrabad). Deployments during the war with Iraq were mainly of temporary character. A major reorganization of existing air-defense SAM and AAA units took place in 1985. There have not been any major reorganizations in the 1990s.

Equipment, capabilities, and performance also strongly influenced the development of the Iraqi Air Force (IQAF) in the 1980s, but also that of the United Arab Emirates Air Force, in the 1990s and the most recent times.

As of 2013 the Iranian authorities also changed the command structure (tactical air bases, military installations, civil airports) and this former status is not in effect any longer. Almost all airfields indicated of being of some strategic importance for contingency scenarios have now been made suitable for combined military and civilian usage. This is also in accordance with the fact that IRIAF only is operating small composite (easy to relocate at very short notice) units spread out all over the country instead of the former large fix-based units. Therefore, all combined airfields are accommodated with basic cross-service capabilities to handle all IRIAF aircraft. The main facilities for logistics and technical overhaul however remain concentrated at some larger airfields.

Iran has been under sanctions since 1979 and thus the country has become capable of servicing and overhauling its own military and civilian aircraft. However, less tension in the current (2015) international situation led to a decrease of the sanctions, and the Iranian government is now capable again in ordering a new fleet of civilian aircraft replacing the aged types.

Jane's 360 military capabilities assessment 2019

Jane's Sentinel in 1993 (p. 27) listed TAB 1 at Mehrabad with six squadrons (F-5Es, F-7Ms, F-14/MiG-29, C-130H/Ilyushin Il-76, Boeing 707/747, and Fokker F-27 Friendship/Dassault Falcon); TAB 2 at Tabriz with three squadrons (F-4D/E "Phantom II"; F-5E, Chengdu F-7M) and a flight of C-130; TAB 3 at Hamadan with a squadron each of Chinese-built Shenyang F-6 and F-7M; TAB 4 at Dezful with a squadron each of F-4D/E and F-5E; TAB 5 was not identified; TAB 6 at Bushehr with a squadron of F-4D/E, and two flights, one of F-7M and one of C-130H; TAB 7 at Shiraz with three squadrons (of F-4D/E; F-14/MiG-29, and C-130H/Il-76) and a flight of F 27; TAB 8 at Isfahan with three squadrons (of F-5E; F-6; and F-7M) and a flight of F 27; TAB 9 at Bandar Abbas with two squadrons (of F-4D/E and F-7M) and a F-14A detachment, plus a flight of Lockheed P-3F Orion; TAB 10 at Chah Bahar with a squadron of F-6 and a flight of C-130H/Il-76; and TAB 11 listed at Ghale Morghi (Beech F33) and Mushshak (PC-7, Tucano), the Flying Training School, plus detachments at Aghajari.

Aircraft

Current inventory 

In 2007, Iraq asked Iran to return some of the scores of Iraqi fighter planes that flew there ahead of the Gulf War in 1991. As of 2014, Iran was receptive to the demands and was working on refurbishing an unspecified number of jets. In late 2014, Iran returned 130 military aircraft to Iraq.

Rumored future expansion plans 

A 13-year long UN arms embargo imposed on Iran was lifted on 18 October 2020. Although there was speculation that when the arms embargo ended the Iranian Air Force would undertake an expansion and modernization program, it is not likely.

One of the most crucial aspects of this program, along with the personnel training and facilities construction, will be the purchase of the most advanced Russian and Chinese jets in considerable quantities. There have been rumors that the IRIAF would be interested in the following aircraft for its modernization program:

 Su-30: It is reported that Israeli defense officials were investigating a potential Iran–Russia deal, in which Iran would pay $1 billion for a dozen squadrons’ worth of Su-30 jets. Iran and Russia have both denied this and have rejected these claims as propaganda. In a broadcast the Mehr News Agency a dozen Su-30s were seen on 15, 16 September 2008; further the report reads: "In this joint maneuver of the IRIAF and the AFAGIR which is called the 'Guardians of the Nations Skies' the Air Forces of Iran have tested domestically developed systems as well as newly purchased systems (from Russia and China)." The purchase of this fighter would improve Iranian air force capability significantly, as it would be able to cover almost the entire Middle East from the Iranian territory.

 Su-34 Fullback: Unconfirmed reports stated that Iran is considering the purchase of the tactical bomber in considerable numbers, once the arms embargo ends, in order to obtain a crucial tactical bombing capability over its neighbours, while replacing its older Su-24.

 Su-35: Iran is reportedly interested in this aircraft in order to obtain a crucial edge over its potential rivals in the region.

 Su-57: Iranian interest in this 5th generation platform is well known, and reportedly it is interested in purchasing several squadrons once the arms embargo is lifted. The purchase of this combat jet, would give Iran a crucial advantage in air capability, as the IRIAF would be able to cover the entire Middle East from Iran (as far as Cairo and Yemen without refuelling).

 J-10: The Russian news agency Novosti reported that Business & Financial Markets said Iran has signed a deal with China to buy two squadrons/24 of J-10 fighter planes with Russian-made AL-31FN engines. The total cost of the planes is estimated at $1 billion, and deliveries are expected between 2008 and 2010. China denied that it had agreed to sell its home-grown fighter jets to Iran, saying no talks had taken place. Foreign Ministry spokesman Liu Jianchao told reporters: "It's not true, it is an irresponsible report, China has not had talks with Iran on J-10 jets."

 JF-17 Thunder: According to Global Security, in July 2003 Chengdu Aircraft Industrial Corporation (CAIC) unveiled the new 'Super-7' or Chao Qi fighter plane to the public, China supposedly received orders from Iran. The plane, now called the FC-1 is an export version of the JF-17 Thunder and entered production in 2006.

 Shenyang J-31: There are some unconfirmed rumours that Iran is interested in this aircraft as a 5th generation complement for its Su-57 purchases, once the arms embargo is lifted.

Reportedly, Iranian interest also goes for other no less important air elements, such as tanker and support aircraft. The pursued aircraft in this regard are:

 Beriev A-100 AWACS

 Ilyushin Il-78 tanker

Facilities

In the last several years several new airfields have been constructed in central- and eastern Iran. Some of these facilities have since seen full-scale deployments of IRIAF units, and it now appears that at least two became permanent "Tactical Fighter Bases" (TFBs). These are the first such bases established since 1979. Except new airfields, with Chinese support, the IRIAF constructed also a number of new early warning radar sites around the country. Its ability to control the national airspace, however, remains limited—mainly due to the rugged terrain and lack of airborne early warning assets.

Aside from maintaining 17 TFBs, the IRIAF operates numerous temporary detachments on several minor airfields around the country. Ex-Iraqi Mirage F.1EQs, usually based at TFB.14, near Mashhad, were frequently seen over the Persian Gulf in 2005 and 2006.

Major operations
 Iran–Iraq War
 Operation Kaman 99, Iran's biggest air raid during Iran–Iraq war with a strength of more than 140 aircraft
 Operation Scorch Sword, an Iranian airstrike on an Iraqi nuclear reactor under construction
 H-3 airstrike, IRIAF's boldest operation in Iraq
 Operation Pearl, a successful joint operation by Iranian air force and navy in Persian Gulf against the Iraqi air force and navy
 Operation Sultan 10, an operation to disturb delivery and training of new French fighter planes to the Iraqi air force during the Iran–Iraq war

See also
 Flying ace
 F-14 Tomcat operational history
 Iranian aerial victories during the Iran–Iraq war
 Iraqi aerial victories during the Iran–Iraq war
 List of aces of aces

References
Notes

External links

 Official site of the Islamic Republic of Iran Air Force

 
Military units and formations established in 1979
1979 establishments in Iran